Nadine Sabra Meyer is an American poet.

Life

Nadine Meyer grew up in Baltimore, MD, where she earned a B.A. in Writing Seminars from the Johns Hopkins University.   She earned her M.F.A. from George Mason University and a Ph.D. in English and Creative Writing from the University of Missouri, Columbia.  Her forthcoming book of poems, entitled Chrysanthemum, Chrysanthemum, won the Green Rose Prize and will be published by New Issues Poetry and Prose in spring 2017.  Her first book of poems, The Anatomy Theater, won the National Poetry Series, and was published by HarperCollins. Her poems have won the New Letters Prize for Poetry, the Meridian Editor's Prize, and a Pushcart Prize.  
Nadine is currently an Associate Professor of English and Creative Writing at Gettysburg College.

She graduated from Johns Hopkins University, George Mason University, and the University of Missouri.

Her work has appeared in Chelsea, Quarterly West, Notre Dame Review, North American Review, Pleiades, Southern Poetry Review, and Mississippi Review.

Awards
2016 Green Rose Prize for Poetry
2011 Meridian Editor's Prize for Poetry
2005 National Poetry Series
2005 New Letters Prize for Poetry
Pushcart Prize

Works
Chrysanthemum, Chrysanthemum, forthcoming with New Issues Poetry and Prose spring 2017
 The Anatomy Theater HarperCollins. 2006.

Anthologies

External links

"cherry series round 1: NADINE MEYER / STEVE GEHRKE", Rice Review,  October 8, 2007
"The Anatomy Theater (review)", The Missouri Review

1968 births
Living people
Johns Hopkins University alumni
George Mason University alumni
University of Missouri alumni
George Mason University faculty
University of Missouri faculty
Seton Hall University faculty
Gettysburg College faculty
American women poets
21st-century American poets
American women academics
21st-century American women writers